Dehlin is a surname. Notable people with the surname include:

Joel Dehlin, American entrepreneur
John Dehlin (born 1969), American podcast host